Nallet is a French surname, and may refer to:
Jean-Claude Nallet (born 1947), French Olympic sprinter
Chantal Seggiaro (-Nallet, born 1956), French Olympic gymnast, wife of Jean-Claude Nallet
Henri Nallet (born 1939), French politician
Lionel Nallet (born 1976), French rugby player